The Coupe de France 1987–88 was its 71st edition. It was won by FC Metz.

Round of 16

Quarter-finals

Semi-finals

1st round

2nd round

Final

References

French federation

1987–88 domestic association football cups
1987–88 in French football
1987-88